The 1912 Southwest Texas State football team was an American football team that represented Southwest Texas State Normal School—now known as Texas State University–as an independent during the 1912 college football season. The team was led by third-year head coach James R. Coxen and finished the season with a record of 3–3–2.

Schedule

Notes

References

Southwest Texas State
Texas State Bobcats football seasons
College football winless seasons
Southwest Texas State Bobcats football